Grecia Elena Rojas Ortiz is a Peruvian lawyer and politician. She served as Minister of Women and Vulnerable Populations in the government of Dina Boluarte December 2022 to January 2023. She is a graduate of the University of San Martín de Porres.

References

Year of birth missing (living people)
Living people
Peruvian women lawyers
21st-century Peruvian lawyers
21st-century women lawyers
21st-century Peruvian politicians
21st-century Peruvian women politicians
Women's ministers of Peru
Women government ministers of Peru
University of San Martín de Porres alumni